Sugar Creek is a stream in Clark and Lewis Counties in the U.S. state of Missouri. It is a tributary of the Wyaconda River.

The stream flows to the east-southeast into Lewis County and passes about one mile north of Williamstown. It continues to the southeast passing the community of Benjamin where it turns more to the southeast and crosses under Missouri Route 16.

Sugar Creek most likely was named for the sugar maple trees along its course.

See also
List of rivers of Missouri

References

Rivers of Clark County, Missouri
Rivers of Lewis County, Missouri
Rivers of Missouri